Party Husband is a 1931 American pre-Code comedy film produced by First National Pictures and released through their parent company Warner Bros. It was directed by Clarence G. Badger and stars Dorothy Mackaill. It is preserved at the Library of Congress.

Cast
Dorothy Mackaill as Laura
James Rennie as Jay Hogarth
Dorothy Peterson as Kate
Joe Donahue as Pat
Donald Cook as Horace Purcell
Helen Ware as Mrs. Duell
Paul Porcasi as Henri Renard
Mary Doran as Bee Canfield

Uncredited:
Robert Allen
Louise Beavers as Laura's maid
Bill Elliott as Wedding party guest
Gilbert Emery as Ben Holliday
Barbara Weeks as Sally

Home media
The film is offered on DVD as a double feature from Warner Archives along with another Mackaill Pre-Code feature, Office Wife.

References

External links

Films directed by Clarence G. Badger
American black-and-white films
American comedy films
1931 comedy films
1930s English-language films
1930s American films